The Trio is a jazz live album by pianist Oscar Peterson, guitarist Joe Pass, and bassist Niels-Henning Ørsted Pedersen. Released in 1974, the album won the Grammy Award for Best Jazz Performance by a Group in 1975.

Reception

In his Allmusic review, critic Scott Yanow complimented the playing of Pass and Pedersen but wrote, "the reason to acquire this set is for the remarkable Oscar Peterson. The pianist brilliantly investigates several jazz styles...Peterson really flourished during his years with Norman Granz's Pablo label, and this was one of his finest recordings of the period."

Track listing
 "Blues Etude" (Oscar Peterson) – 5:31
 "Chicago Blues" (Peterson) – 13:52
 "Easy Listening Blues" (Nadine Robinson) – 7:53
 "Come Sunday" (Duke Ellington) – 3:46
 "Secret Love" (Sammy Fain, Paul Francis Webster) – 7:15

Personnel
 Oscar Peterson – piano
 Joe Pass – guitar
 Niels-Henning Ørsted Pedersen – bass

References

1974 live albums
Joe Pass live albums
Niels-Henning Ørsted Pedersen live albums
Oscar Peterson live albums
Pablo Records live albums
Albums produced by Norman Granz
Collaborative albums
Grammy Award for Best Jazz Instrumental Album